Pyrausta insularis is a moth in the family Crambidae. It is found in Cuba.

The forewings are cinereous. The hindwings are a little paler.

References

Moths described in 1867
insularis
Moths of the Caribbean